Flavopunctelia borrerioides is a species of foliose lichen in the family Parmeliaceae. It was described as a new species by Japanese lichenologist Syo Kurokawa in 1999. There it was found growing in a forest containing predominantly Juniper, Opuntia, and Agave. The lichen is found in Peru, Mexico, and India.

References

borrerioides
Lichens described in 1999
Lichens of Mexico
Lichens of Peru
Lichens of India
Lichen species
Taxa named by Syo Kurokawa